Winslow Public Schools is a school district in Winslow, Maine. The superintendent of schools is Peter A. Thiboutot, who was formerly the assistant superintendent of AOS92 until 2018. The Winslow Superintendent's Office is located at 20 Dean Street in Winslow, next to the Winslow Elementary School. Winslow Public Schools has roughly 1,200 students.

Schools
 Winslow High School
 Winslow Junior High School
 Winslow Elementary School

For students at the WHS, they can choose to attend Mid Maine Technical Center (MMTC) for part of the day at Waterville High School.

History
For many years, Winslow was a member of School Union No. 52, which also included China and Vassalboro. School Union 52 dissolved in 2009 when AOS 92 was formed under a new state law. In 2018, Kennebec Valley Consolidated Schools (KVCS) AOS 92 dissolved, and Winslow returned to an independent school district.

Administrators 

Peter A. Thiboutot - Superintendent of Schools
Amanda Dunn - Finance Director of Winslow & Vassalboro Community School
Mary Boyle - Curriculum Director
Shelly Phillips - Facilities Director
Amy Benham - Special Education Director K-5
Tabitha King - Special Education Director 6-12
Lisa Gadway - Transportation Director

References

External links
 Winslow Public Schools
School districts in Maine
Education in Kennebec County, Maine
School districts established in 2018